Zebulon P. Burdick (June 10, 1806 – April 3, 1892) was a member of the Wisconsin State Senate and the Wisconsin State Assembly.

Biography
Burdick was born Zebulon Palmer Burdick on June 10, 1806 in Grafton, New York, the fourth of twelve children born to Joseph and Betsey Burdick. In 1828, he married Amanda M. Demoray. They had two children. In 1838, he married Philena Brock. They had three children. Burdick and his family moved to Wisconsin in 1849, settling in Rock County, Wisconsin. In 1852, they moved to Janesville, Wisconsin. Burdick died on April 3, 1892. He and his family were members of the Methodist Episcopal Church.

Career
Burdick was elected to the Assembly in 1858. He was then a member of the Senate from 1859 to 1860. Later, he was again a member of the Assembly, serving until 1875. Previously, he had been Chairman of the Rock County Board of Supervisors. He was a Republican.

References

People from Rensselaer County, New York
Politicians from Janesville, Wisconsin
Republican Party Wisconsin state senators
Republican Party members of the Wisconsin State Assembly
County supervisors in Wisconsin
1806 births
1892 deaths
19th-century American politicians